Fairview is the name of some places in the U.S. state of Idaho:

 Fairview, Franklin County, Idaho
 Fairview, Owyhee County, Idaho, an old mining ghost town in the Silver City Historic District (Idaho)
 Fairview, Power County, Idaho
 Fairview, Twin Falls County, Idaho

See also 
 Fairview (disambiguation)